Erna Putz (born 3 May 1946) is an Austrian theologian and author who wrote and edited books on conscientious objector and martyr Franz Jägerstätter, determined to promote his faithful life to the public since 1979. The film A Hidden Life was influenced by her book Franz Jägerstätter: Letters and Writings from Prison.

Early life
Putz grew up in Ohlsdorf, Austria.

Bibliography
Putz, Erna (1985). Franz Jägerstätter „… besser die Hände als der Wille gefesselt…“ (in German). Linz: Veritas-Verlag.
Putz, Erna (1987). Gefängnisbriefe und Aufzeichnungen. Franz Jägerstätter verweigert 1943 den Wehrdienst. (in German). Linz: Veritas-Verlag.
Putz, Erna (1996). Against the Stream: Franz Jägerstätter -The Man Who Refused to Fight for Hitler. London: Pax Christi, Anglican Pacifist Fellowship.
Putz, Erna (2007). Franz Jägerstätter - Märtyrer: Leuchtendes Beispiel in dunkler Zeit [Franz Jägerstätter - Martyr: A Shining Example in Dark Times] (in German). Grünbach: Steinmassl, Franz.
Jägerstätter, Franz (2007). Putz, Erna (ed.). Franz Jägerstätter: Der gesamte Briefwechsel mit Franziska. Aufzeichnungen 1941-1943 (in German). Vienna: Styria Premium.
Putz, Erna; Schlager-Weidinger, Thomas (eds.) (2008). Liebe Franziska! Lieber Franz! Junge Briefe an die Jägerstätters (in German). Linz: Wagner Verlag. (}
Jägerstätter, Franz (2009). Putz, Erna (ed.). Franz Jägerstätter: Letters and Writings from Prison. Maryknoll, NY: Orbis Books.

References

1946 births
20th-century Austrian women writers
21st-century Austrian women writers
Austrian biographers
20th-century Austrian Roman Catholic theologians
Living people
20th-century biographers
21st-century biographers
Women biographers
Women Christian theologians
21st-century Austrian Roman Catholic theologians
People from Gmunden District